129th Brigade may refer to:

 CXXIX International Brigade (Spain)
 129th Infantry Brigade (United Kingdom)